Eravur Urban Council (EUC) is the local authority for the town of Eravur in eastern Sri Lanka. EUC is responsible for providing a variety of local public services including roads, sanitation, drains, housing, libraries, public parks and recreational facilities. It has 9 members elected using the open list proportional representation system.

Election results

2006 local government election
Results of the local government election held on 20 May 2006:

{| class="wikitable" border="1" style="text-align:right;"
! valign=bottom align=left colspan=2|Alliances and parties !! valign=bottom align=center width="60"|Votes !! valign=bottom align=center width="50"|% !! valign=bottom align=center|Seats
|-
| bgcolor=|  || align=left|Independent 6 (Sri Lanka Muslim Congress)
| 3,501 || 36.89% || 5
|-
| bgcolor=|  || align=left|United People's Freedom Alliance (NUA, NC, SLFP et al.)
| 2,460 || 25.92% || 2
|-
| bgcolor=|  || align=left|United National Party
| 2,004 || 21.11% || 1|-
|  || align=left|Independent 3
| 716 || 7.54% || 1|-
| bgcolor=|  || align=left|Tamil National Alliance (ITAK, EPRLF (S), TELO, ACTC)
| 521 || 5.49% || 0|-
|  || align=left|Independent 4
| 130 || 1.37% || 0|-
|  || align=left|Independent 1
| 124 || 1.31% || 0|-
|  || align=left|Independent 5
| 22 || 0.23% || 0|-
|  || align=left|Independent 7
| 9 || 0.09% || 0|-
|  || align=left|Independent 2
| 4 || 0.04% || 0|-
| colspan=2 align=left|Valid Votes| 9,491 || 100.00% || 9'''
|-
| colspan=2 align=left| Rejected Votes
| 280 || colspan=2|
|-
| colspan=2 align=left| Total Polled
| 9,771 || colspan=2|
|-
| colspan=2 align=left| Registered Electors
| 16,322 || colspan=2|
|-
| colspan=2 align=left| Turnout
| 59.86% || colspan=2|
|}

The following candidates were elected: Mohamed Cassim Abdul Gafoor (SLMC); Abu Haniffa Sahul Hameed (SLMC); Abdul Gafoor Mohamed Hassan (SLMC); Jamaldeen Mohamadu Jemeel (Ind 3); Mahumoothu Lebbe Abdul Lathief (UNP); Hayathu Mohamed Noor Mohamed (SLMC); Ahamed Farsath Jamaldeen Mohamed Musthafa (SLMC); Abdul Latif Mohamadu Yoosuf (UPFA); and Mohamadu Sarif Zubair (UPFA).

Mohamed Cassim Abdul Gafoor (SLMC) and Abu Haniffa Sahul Hameed (SLMC) were appointed Chairman and Deputy Chairman respectively.

The term of the council was due to expire in 2010 but on 22 December 2009 Minister of Local Government and Provincial Councils Janaka Bandara Tennakoon extended it until 31 March 2011.

Eravur Town Rural Council (Eravur Town Pradesha Sabhai or Eravur Town Pradeshiya Sabha'') was promoted and renamed Eravur Urban Council with effect from 1 April 2011.

2011 local government election
Results of the local government election held on 17 March 2011:

The following candidates were elected: Akeel Arshath K. L.; Abdul Raseed Firous; Abdul Lathief Mahumoothu Lebbe; Ameen Issath Mohideen; Seyed Ali Zahir Moulana (UPFA); Meera Labbey Rebupasam; Poopalaretnam Sasikaran; Mohamed Ismail Mohamed Thasleem (UPFA); and Iramlan Abdul Wasith.

Seyed Ali Zahir Moulana (UPFA) and Mohamed Ismail Mohamed Thasleem (UPFA) were appointed Chairman and Deputy Chairman respectively.

References

Government of Batticaloa District
Local authorities in Eastern Province, Sri Lanka
Urban councils of Sri Lanka